Petone (Māori: Pito-one), a large suburb of Lower Hutt, Wellington, stands at the southern end of the Hutt Valley, on the northern shore of Wellington Harbour. The Māori name  means "end of the sand beach".

Europeans first settled in Petone in January 1840, making it the oldest European settlement in the Wellington Region. It became a borough in 1888, and merged with Lower Hutt (branded as "Hutt City") in 1989.

Geography 
Petone is flat. It is nestled between the Hutt River to the north and east, hills on the west and Wellington Harbour to the south. The land along the Petone foreshore was uplifted by a metre or more after the 1855 Wairarapa earthquake. This improved drainage around the mouth of the Hutt River. The foreshore at Petone has a shallow sandy beach, formed by sediment from the Hutt River, which is a popular family swimming spot. The Korokoro Stream comes down off the hills at the western side of Petone. 

As a low-lying suburb, Petone is vulnerable to tsunami and the threat of flooding. During a severe storm on 20 December 1976, the Korokoro Stream caused flooding almost a metre deep in the industrial area of Petone around Cornish Street, and more than 40 people had to be rescued from factory roofs.

History 
Two Maori pā (fortified settlement) were already established at Pito-one near the beach when the first European settlers arrived in the region. At the western end of the beach was the Pito-one pā, and at the other end near the mouth of the Hutt River stood Ngati Awa's Hikoikoi pā. In 1850 the pā at Pito-one was described as "the largest and best fortified within the District of Wellington ... their cultivations of kumara and maize look well and the residents, in point of comfort and wealth, are better off than any of the Port Nicholson natives ... total population 136".  

Edward Jerningham Wakefield described the locality as a "sandy beach, which is about two miles long. The main river falls into the sea at the eastern end ... and is called the Heretaunga [Hutt River]. A merry brawling stream, called the Korokoro, or "throat", flows between [Pito-one pa] and the western hills. The valley ... [is] bounded on either side by wooded hills from 300 to 400 feet in height.  It was covered with high forest to within a mile and a half of the beach, when swamps full of flax and a belt of sand hummocks intervened." 

Petone was the first European settlement in the Wellington region and retains many historical buildings and landmarks. The first European settlers in large numbers arrived on 22 January 1840 on the ship Aurora which brought 25 married couples, 36 single persons and 40 children. The Aurora is commemorated in the Petone Settlers Museum, which has a sculpture shaped like the bow of the ship protruding from the front of the building. Maori from the nearby Pito-one pā came to meet the new arrivals, with one passenger recording in his diary: "The first great object of attraction was the venerable old chief Te Puni, his interesting and beautiful wife ‘Victoria,’ and his handsome daughter Aena, the princess, together with sons and endless relatives and a pa full of natives who were delighted to greet us with ‘Kapai te Pakeha,’ Tena-koe, and other expressions of greeting.” 

A beach settlement of small wooden houses and tents was established, which was initially called Britannia.  The earliest European settlers found life hard.  Nevertheless, the settlement grew: the population of "Pito-one and Hutt" in 1845 was given as 649, compared to, "Town of Wellington" of 2,667.  There was horse racing at Pito-one Beach on 20 October 1842, attracting a crowd of five or six hundred people from Wellington.

After repeated flooding, most settlers moved south around the harbour to Thorndon.  Thorndon is at the shore of what is now the city of Wellington, New Zealand's capital. 

From the late 19th century and for much of the 20th century, Petone was a thriving, largely working-class town. It was the location of several large industrial sites, including car assembly plants, a meat processing plant, a wool processing plant, a tobacco processing plant, a soap factory and a toothpaste factory. The majority of these closed in the 1970s and 1980s, resulting in gradual economic decline in the area.  

Defunct Petone industries 

 Petone Railway Workshops 1876 – 1929
 Gear Meat Company 1882 – 1981
 Wellington Woollen Manufacturing Company 1883 – 1968 (company founded 1883, manufacture began at Petone in 1886)
 Lever Brothers soap factory (later became Unilever) 1919 – 2015
 W.D. & H.O. Wills tobacco factory 1919 – 2020
 New Zealand Motor Bodies vehicle assembly plant 1926 – 1978
 General Motors vehicle assembly plant 1926 – 1984
 Todd Motors vehicle assembly plant 1935 – 1974. The company closed the Petone factory after building a new plant at Porirua in the early 1970s.
 Colgate-Palmolive toothpaste and toiletries factory 1939 – 2007
 Austin Motor Industries vehicle assembly plant  (later New Zealand Motor Corporation, then Emco Group)  1946 – 1983

Petone gained borough status in 1888. The borough's first coat of arms had images representing the Gear Meat Company, the woollen mills and the railway workshops, showing how important these businesses were to the local economy. Petone Borough amalgamated with Lower Hutt as a result of the local government reform in 1989. The suburb has since enjoyed renewed economic growth, using its early European heritage as a draw for tourists and gaining many cafes and shops.

Petone is home to the Petone Rugby Club founded in 1885.

State housing 
New Zealand's first state housing was constructed in Petone in 1906, with some of the original houses remaining in good condition. The local tourist office provides a guide showing where these houses are located. Star Flats (state housing apartment blocks built in the 1960s) are located in Jackson Street and East Street.

Demographics 

Petone had a population of 7,491 at the 2018 New Zealand census, an increase of 816 people (12.2%) since the 2013 census, and an increase of 945 people (14.4%) since the 2006 census. There were 2,955 households. There were 3,753 males and 3,738 females, giving a sex ratio of 1.0 males per female, with 1,167 people (15.6%) aged under 15 years, 1,650 (22.0%) aged 15 to 29, 3,492 (46.6%) aged 30 to 64, and 1,188 (15.9%) aged 65 or older.

Ethnicities were 71.6% European/Pākehā, 15.5% Māori, 8.2% Pacific peoples, 16.1% Asian, and 2.4% other ethnicities (totals add to more than 100% since people could identify with multiple ethnicities).

The proportion of people born overseas was 28.0%, compared with 27.1% nationally.

Although some people objected to giving their religion, 48.4% had no religion, 35.0% were Christian, 4.9% were Hindu, 0.8% were Muslim, 0.9% were Buddhist and 4.5% had other religions.

Of those at least 15 years old, 2,046 (32.4%) people had a bachelor or higher degree, and 852 (13.5%) people had no formal qualifications. The employment status of those at least 15 was that 3,468 (54.8%) people were employed full-time, 795 (12.6%) were part-time, and 261 (4.1%) were unemployed.

Points of interest

Jackson Street 
Petone's main street has over 220 businesses (most are small unique businesses), has free parking, is a hub for hospitality, and is listed by Heritage New Zealand as a historic area. Petone's former police station and jail, built in 1908, were moved to a site on Jackson Street in 1994 from Elizabeth Street, and is home to the Jackson Street Programme Inc. (JSP) which was established in 1992.  The Historic Police Station is the JSP's office, and has information on Jackson Street and Petone for visitors and tourists.  The Old Jail became a museum with exhibits about policing in Petone and the history of Jackson Street. Jackson Street also features a 'Walk of Champions': over 140 bronze plaques have been laid on the footpath celebrating 200 local sportspeople who have represented New Zealand or become national champions in their sport.

St David's Church

St David's is a Presbyterian church at 4 Britannia Street with a Heritage New Zealand Category 2 listing. It was built in 1889 in a simple Colonial Gothic style designed by Christian Toxward. Originally it had a large steeple but this was later removed after being damaged by weather and rot. In 1993 the steeple was restored and a porte cochere was added. The church has a decorated pipe organ and there is a large stained glass memorial window. The church is now used for services by the Samoan community.

St Augustine's Church

St Augustine's is an Anglican church at 12 Britannia Street which has a Heritage New Zealand Category 2 listing. The church is built of wood, and was designed by Frederick de Jersey Clere in a gothic style. When it was built in 1902-1903 it had the tallest spire in New Zealand, but the spire was removed in 1954 after being damaged in a storm.

Te Puna Wai Ora 
The Te Puna Wai Ora (Spring of Life) in Buick Street provides pure untreated artesian (underground pressured) water from taps.  The water originates from the Hutt River at the Taita Gorge and is safe to drink in its natural form as it has been naturally filtered through the alluvial gravels and sands of the Hutt Valley over several years.  It is free, and consumers travel long distances to collect the water for drinking purposes.

Petone Settlers Museum 
The museum is housed in the Wellington Provincial Centennial Memorial Building on the Petone foreshore, opposite Buick Street.  The building was opened on Wellington Anniversary Day 1940 to commemorate the arrival of the ship Aurora - arrival of first European Settlement.  It is a building of national significance.

Iona Cross 
In February 1940 a stone cross was erected on the Petone foreshore near the Settlers Museum, to commemorate 100 years since the first Presbyterian church service in New Zealand was held on board the settler ship Bengal Merchant at Petone on 23 February 1840. The cross is 2.7 m (15ft) high and carved on one side. The cross was supposed to have been a replica of the MacLean Cross at Iona in Scotland donated by the Church of Scotland, but due to the outbreak of World War 2 this was not possible. Instead, the cross was carved in Auckland or Coromandel, and is made of Coromandel Tonalite, a type of rock formerly quarried on the Coromandel Peninsula. The cross has a 'Historic Place Category 2' listing from Heritage New Zealand.

Hōniana Te Puni-kōkopu memorial 
This memorial can be found in the Te Puni Street urūpa (burial ground).

Hikoikoi Reserve
The reserve is a park and walkway at the mouth of the Hutt River. It features a disc-golf course. The reserve was the site of Ngati Awa's Hikoikoi Pa.

Petone Wharf 
One remnant of Petone's industrial history is the Petone Wharf. The original wharf was built to allow the Gear Meat Works to move its products quickly to Wellington for export. That wharf was demolished and the current wharf built slightly further north along the shore in 1907. The wharf was popular with walkers and people fishing, but was closed to the public in January 2021 after suffering earthquake damage in the 2016 Kaikoura earthquake and two smaller subsequent earthquakes. In May 2021 Hutt City Council voted to repair the wharf but as of May 2022 was still considering the best course of action.

Petone Rotary Fair 

The Petone Rotary Fair is a notable local event, held annually since 1992, that draws people from all over the greater Wellington region to Jackson Street, Petone's main thoroughfare, which is closed off to traffic for the event.

The purpose of the fair is not only to raise the profile of Petone and provide an enjoyable day out, but to raise money for charity. The fair consists of various stalls selling products such as plants, artwork, jewellery, CDs & DVDs, cosmetics, food and drink, etc., and there are musicians, carnival rides, and displays from various organisations such as the New Zealand Fire Service.

Education
Petone has three schools:

Petone Central School is a state full primary (Year 1–8) school in central Petone, with  students as of 
Sacred Heart School is a state-integrated Catholic full primary (Year 1–8) school in central Petone, and has  students as of 
Wilford School is a state full primary (Year 1–8) school in north-eastern Petone, and has  students as of 

Since Petone College (formerly called Hutt Valley Memorial Technical College) closed in 1998, Hutt Valley High School in central Lower Hutt has been the nearest state secondary school to Petone.

The main campus of the Wellington Institute of Technology (Weltec) is located in Petone.

See also 

 Automotive industry in New Zealand
 Names of immigrants who arrived on the Aurora

References

External links 
 Discover Historic Petone: A website listing 37 points of interest in a tour around Petone.
 Jackson Street Programme: Information and history of Jackson Street.

Suburbs of Lower Hutt
Populated places on Te Awa Kairangi / Hutt River
Populated places around the Wellington Harbour